Shaheed Fazil Rahu (also known as Golarchi) is a city in district Badin. The old name of Golarchi was Tando Akram. It then changed to Shaheed Fazil Rahu after the murder of Fazil Rahu. Golarchi is famous for petroleum and natural gas. It is also an agriculture centre famous for sunflowers, paddies and sugarcane. In Golarchi, there are several oil fields in various locations. One of the main oil fields is near Kario Ghanwar. The main oil and gas field of Golarchi is located at 25 chak on Sujawal–Badin road.

One of the biggest producers of rice and sunflower in Pakistan, it generates a reasonable revenue. Golarchi has several mills and grinding centers for rice. The total number of rice mills in Golarchi is over 50 Including Garibsons Pvt Ltd, Pakistan's largest rice exporter.

References

Populated places in Badin District
Talukas of Sindh